Nahum Olin, Sr. (born August 16, 1957) is a Mexican race car driver  and team owner from Mexico City. He was champion of the 2001 Mexican Super Touring Championship. He has won championships as team owner in the 2003 and 2004 Clio Cup Mexico Series. He currently is a team owner in the Desafio Corona Series.

References

1957 births
Living people
Mexican racing drivers
Racing drivers from Mexico City